Lee Whitlock (17 April 1968 – 17 February 2023) was a British television and film actor. Of the many roles in film and TV, they included Shine on Harvey Moon (1982), Two of Us (1987), Casualty (1991), Grange Hill (1993),  Sweeney Todd: The Demon Barber of Fleet Street, London's Burning, and The Bill (all 2007) and Ill Manors (2012).

Career
At age 12, Whitlock gave his debut in the British television series The Gentle Touch in 1980. In 1982 he starred in a main role as Stanley Moon, the son of Harvey Moon, for five seasons and 41 episodes of ITV's Shine on Harvey Moon. In 1982, he appeared as Falstaff's page Robin in The Merry Wives of Windsor.

In 1987, he had a short appearance in the British film Wish You Were Here by David Leland, and he became further notable in the 1987 television drama Two of Us, about a gay relationship between two schoolboys. The following year he starred alongside Chris Gascoyne in Central Television's series for schools, Starting Out.

In 1989, Whitlock played his most notable role, that of Sydney Chaplin, the  elder half-brother  of Charlie Chaplin, in the television movie Young Charlie Chaplin by Bazz Taylor. Further well-known series where he had roles were  Split Ends, EastEnders, Harry Enfield's Television Programme, Lovejoy, Soldier Soldier, Boon, Grange Hill, A Touch of Frost, The Detectives, Silent Witness, McCallum, Casualty, London's Burning and The Bill. In 2007, he played a policeman in Sweeney Todd: The Demon Barber of Fleet Street which starred Johnny Depp and Helena Bonham Carter. In 1992, Whitlock also starred in the W.I.Z. directed short film for Flowered Up's song "Weekender", playing the role of Little Joe. In 1993, he appeared as Ben Levis in four episodes of BBC children's drama series Grange Hill.

Death
Whitlock died on 17 February 2023, at the age of 54.

Filmography

Bibliography
 Holmstrom, John. The Moving Picture Boy: An International Encyclopaedia from 1895 to 1995. Norwich, Michael Russell, 1996, p. 371.

References

External links

 

1968 births
2023 deaths
English male child actors
English male television actors
People from Hammersmith